Van Galder is a surname. Notable people with the surname include:

Clark Van Galder (1909–1965), American football player, basketball player, track athlete, and coach
Tim Van Galder (1944–2022), American football player

See also
Van Gelder, surname

Surnames of Dutch origin